Primrose Hill is a park in London, England. It may also refer to:

Places
Primrose Hill (district), a district north of Primrose Hill in London, England
Primrose Hill (ward), a ward of the London Borough of Camden
Primrose Hill, Dudley, West Midlands, England, United Kingdom
Primrose Hill, Huddersfield, West Yorkshire, England, United Kingdom
Primrose Hill (Annapolis, Maryland), a historic home in the United States
Primrose Hill (Hong Kong), a private housing estate in Tai Wo Hau, Tsuen Wan, Hong Kong
Primrose Hill railway station, former railway station at Primrose Hill, London
Primrose Hill Park in Coventry

Ships
SS Primrose Hill, a catapult-armed merchant ship built in 1941 and sunk in 1942
Primrose Hill (barque), a sailing barque built in 1886 and wrecked in 1900
SS Samflora or SS Primrose Hill, a Liberty ship built in 1943 and scrapped in 1968

Songs
"Primrose Hill", a 1946 song by Charlie Chester, Ken Morris and Everett Lynton
"Primrose Hill", a 1969 song by Kathe Green from Run the Length of Your Wildness
"Primrose Hill", a 1970 song by John and Beverley Martyn from The Road to Ruin
"Primrose Hill", a 1998 song by Loudon Wainwright III
"North West Three", a 2004 song by Fatboy Slim from Palookaville
"Primrose Hill", a song by Madness from their 1982 album The Rise & Fall